A quadrupole ion trap or paul trap is a type of ion trap that uses dynamic electric fields to trap charged particles. They are also called radio frequency (RF) traps or Paul traps in honor of Wolfgang Paul, who invented the device and shared the Nobel Prize in Physics in 1989 for this work. It is used as a component of a mass spectrometer or a trapped ion quantum computer.

Overview 

A charged particle, such as an atomic or molecular ion, feels a force from an electric field. It is not possible to create a static configuration of electric fields that traps the charged particle in all three directions (this restriction is known as Earnshaw's theorem). It is possible, however, to create an average confining force in all three directions by use of electric fields that change in time. To do so, the confining and anti-confining directions are switched at a rate faster than it takes the particle to escape the trap. The traps are also called "radio frequency" traps because the switching rate is often at a radio frequency.

The quadrupole is the simplest electric field geometry used in such traps, though more complicated geometries are possible for specialized devices. The electric fields are generated from electric potentials on metal electrodes. A pure quadrupole is created from hyperbolic electrodes, though cylindrical electrodes are often used for ease of fabrication. Microfabricated ion traps exist where the electrodes lie in a plane with the trapping region above the plane. There are two main classes of traps, depending on whether the oscillating field provides confinement in three or two dimensions. In the two-dimension case (a so-called "linear RF trap"), confinement in the third direction is provided by static electric fields.

Theory

The 3D trap itself generally consists of two hyperbolic metal electrodes with their focuses facing each other and a hyperbolic ring electrode halfway between the other two electrodes. The ions are trapped in the space between these three electrodes by AC (oscillating) and DC (static) electric fields. The AC radio frequency voltage oscillates between the two hyperbolic metal end cap electrodes if ion excitation is desired; the driving AC voltage is applied to the ring electrode. The ions are first pulled up and down axially while being pushed in radially. The ions are then pulled out radially and pushed in axially (from the top and bottom). In this way the ions move in a complex motion that generally involves the cloud of ions being long and narrow and then short and wide, back and forth, oscillating between the two states. Since the mid-1980s most 3D traps (Paul traps) have used ~1 mTorr of helium.  The use of damping gas and the mass-selective instability mode developed by Stafford et al. led to the first commercial 3D ion traps.

The quadrupole ion trap has two main configurations: the three-dimensional form described above and the linear form made of 4 parallel electrodes. A simplified rectilinear configuration is also used. The advantage of the linear design is its greater storage capacity (in particular of Doppler-cooled ions) and its simplicity, but this leaves a particular constraint on its modeling. The Paul trap is designed to create a saddle-shaped field to trap a charged ion, but with a quadrupole, this saddle-shaped electric field cannot be rotated about an ion in the centre. It can only 'flap' the field up and down. For this reason, the motions of a single ion in the trap are described by Mathieu equations, which can only be solved numerically by computer simulations.

The intuitive explanation and lowest order approximation is the same as strong focusing in accelerator physics.  Since the field affects the acceleration, the position lags behind (to lowest order by half a period).  So the particles are at defocused positions when the field is focusing and vice versa.  Being farther from center, they experience a stronger field when the field is focusing than when it is defocusing.

Equations of motion

Ions in a quadrupole field experience restoring forces that drive them back toward the center of the trap. The motion of the ions in the field is described by solutions to the Mathieu equation. When written for ion motion in a trap, the equation is

The parameter  is the radial frequency of the potential applied to the ring electrode. By using the chain rule, it can be shown that

Substituting  into the Mathieu  yields

Multiplying by m and rearranging terms shows us that

By Newton's laws of motion, the above equation represents the force on the ion. This equation can be exactly solved using the Floquet theorem or the standard techniques of multiple scale analysis. The particle dynamics and time averaged density of charged particles in a Paul trap can also be obtained by the concept of ponderomotive force.

The forces in each dimension are not coupled, thus the force acting on an ion in, for example, the x dimension is

Here,  is the quadrupolar potential, given by

In order to satisfy Laplace's equation, it can be shown that

The applied electric potential is a combination of RF and DC given by

Substituting  into  with  gives

Substituting Equation 9 into Equation 5 leads to

Comparing terms on the right hand side of Equation 1 and Equation 10 leads to

and

Further ,

and

The boundaries of the shaded regions in the figure are the boundaries of stability in the two directions (also known as boundaries of bands). The domain of overlap of the two regions is the trapping domain. For calculation of these boundaries and similar diagrams as above see Müller-Kirsten.

Linear ion trap

The linear ion trap uses a set of quadrupole rods to confine ions radially and a static electrical potential on-end electrodes to confine the ions axially. The linear form of the trap can be used as a selective mass filter, or as an actual trap by creating a potential well for the ions along the axis of the electrodes.  Advantages of the linear trap design are increased ion storage capacity, faster scan times, and simplicity of construction (although quadrupole rod alignment is critical, adding a quality control constraint to their production.  This constraint is additionally present in the machining requirements of the 3D trap).

Cylindrical ion trap

Ion traps with a cylindrical rather than a hyperbolic ring electrode have been developed and microfabricated in arrays to develop miniature mass spectrometers for chemical detection in medical diagnosis and other fields.

Planar ion trap
Quadrupole traps can also be "unfolded" to create the same effect using a set of planar electrodes. This trap geometry can be made using standard micro-fabrication techniques, including the top metal layer in a standard CMOS microelectronics process, and is a key technology for scaling trapped ion quantum computers to useful numbers of qubits.

Combined radio frequency trap
A combined radio frequency trap is a combination of a Paul ion trap and a Penning trap. One of the main bottlenecks of a quadrupole ion trap is that it can confine only single-charged species or multiple species with similar masses. But in certain applications like antihydrogen production it is important to confine two species of charged particles of widely varying masses. To achieve this objective, a uniform magnetic field is added in the axial direction of the quadrupole ion trap.

Digital ion trap 
The digital ion trap (DIT) is a quadrupole ion trap (linear or 3D) that differs from conventional traps by the driving waveform. A DIT is driven by digital signals, typically rectangular waveforms that are generated by switching rapidly between discrete voltage levels. Major advantages of the DIT are its versatility and virtually unlimited mass range. The digital ion trap has been developed mainly as a mass analyzer.

See also 
 Quadrupole magnet

References

Bibliography

 W. Paul  Electromagnetic Traps for Charged and Neutral Particles Taken from Proceedings of the International School of Physics <<Enrico Fermi>>  Course CXVIII “Laser Manipulation of Atoms and Ions”, (North Holland, New York, 1992) p. 497-517
 R.I. Thompson, T.J. Harmon, and M.G. Ball, The rotating-saddle trap: a mechanical analogy to RF-electric-quadrupole ion trapping? (Canadian Journal of Physics, 2002: 80 12) p. 1433–1448
 M. Welling, H.A. Schuessler, R.I. Thompson, H. Walther  Ion/Molecule Reactions, Mass Spectrometry and Optical Spectroscopy in a Linear Ion Trap (International Journal of Mass Spectrometry and Ion Processes, 1998: 172) p. 95-114.

 K. Shah and H. Ramachandran, Analytic, nonlinearly exact solutions for an rf confined plasma, Phys. Plasmas 15, 062303 (2008),  Pradip K. Ghosh, Ion Traps, International Series of Monographs in Physics, Oxford University Press (1995), https://web.archive.org/web/20111102190045/http://www.oup.com/us/catalog/general/subject/Physics/AtomicMolecularOpticalphysics/?view=usa

Patents

External links
Nobel Prize in Physics 1989

Mass spectrometry
Measuring instruments
German inventions
Particle traps